Joseph Jordan (born 1987) is an Irish hurler who plays for Cork Premier Championship club Blarney. He played for the Cork senior hurling team for one season, during which time he usually lined out as a right wing-back.

Jordan began his hurling career at club level with Blarney. After breaking onto the club's top adult team he had one of his greatest successes as right wing-back on Blarney's All-Ireland Intermediate Club Championship-winning team in 2009. He was also selected for University College Cork, with whom he won a Fitzgibbon Cup title in 2009, and the Muskerry divisional team.

At inter-county level, Jordan was part of the Cork minor team that won the Munster Championship in 2005 before later winning an All-Ireland Championship with the intermediate team in 2009. He also joined the Cork senior team in 2009. Jordan was an unused substitute before leaving the panel at the end of the season.

Career statistics

Honours

University College Cork
Fitzgibbon Cup (1): 2009

Blarney
All-Ireland Intermediate Club Hurling Championship (1): 2009
Munster Intermediate Club Hurling Championship (1): 2009
Cork Premier Intermediate Hurling Championship (1): 2008

Cork
All-Ireland Intermediate Hurling Championship (1): 2009
Munster Intermediate Hurling Championship (1): 2009
Munster Minor Hurling Championship (1): 2005

References

1987 births
Living people
Alumni of University College Cork
Blarney hurlers
UCC hurlers
Muskerry hurlers
Cork inter-county hurlers